Susan Flannery (born July 31, 1939) is an American actress and director known for her roles in the daytime dramas The Bold and the Beautiful and Days of Our Lives.

Early life
Flannery was born in Jersey City, New Jersey, on July 31, 1939, and attended school in Manhattan. She received her BA degree from Stephens College, a women's college in Columbia, Missouri, in 1962.

Career

Flannery is known for playing Dr. Laura Spencer Horton from 1966 until 1975 on Days of Our Lives, where she met writer William J. Bell (who later cast her in The Bold and the Beautiful in 1987). She acted in feature films, including The Towering Inferno (1974) and The Gumball Rally (1976). She also acted in the primetime television series Dallas, playing Leslie Stewart during season four (1980–1981), and appeared in an ensemble cast with Kirk Douglas, Joan Collins and Christopher Plummer in the 1976 NBC miniseries The Moneychangers.

Flannery became best known worldwide for portraying Stephanie Douglas Forrester on the American soap opera The Bold and the Beautiful (1987–2012). She was one of the original cast members of the series, only two of whom still appear (Katherine Kelly Lang and John McCook). Flannery was also a regular director on the show, and was twice nominated for a Directors Guild of America Award for her work. After 25 years, she decided to leave the show in 2012. In her final storyline, Stephanie Forrester died from lung cancer.

Flannery appeared in two episodes of ABC's situation comedy Hope & Faith in 2004 with other well-known actors from rival soaps.

Flannery also appeared as a special guest on Good News Week. She appeared in a special episode of Wheel of Fortune with Deidre Hall (Marlena, Days of Our Lives) and Peter Bergman (Jack, The Young and the Restless) in 2006. Flannery also directed the October 13, 2008, episode of Guiding Light.

Flannery came in at #1 in the Top 50 Soap Actresses of All Time poll on the internet blog We Love Soaps in 2010.

Flannery took an active role in the American Federation of Television and Radio Artists (AFTRA), and advocated for  securing cable rights and foreign residuals for actors when their work appears in other media. Her efforts have had a positive impact on how The Bold and the Beautiful actors (and other soap actors) are paid when the show is televised in countries outside the United States.

Personal life
Flannery has an adopted daughter, Blaise.

Gay rights activist Rita Mae Brown socialized with Flannery in Los Angeles in the mid-1970s.  They met through their mutual friend writer and performer Fannie Flagg, with whom Flannery had a multi-year relationship.  Brown wrote the following about Flannery in her 1997 memoir Rita Will:She'd been a star in a long-running TV program and had left to take a prominent role in a film.  Almost white-blonde, with a heart-shaped face, blue eyes and a great figure, she appeared every inch a woman ready to become a major movie star.  She had looks, talent and drive.  What she lacked was the ability to kiss ass.  Just when her career should have rocketed, it began to drop to Earth.  Approaching forty added to the tension.

She is a fundamentally honest person, a decent one.

Word got about [directors and screenwriters] that she was difficult.  That was amended to "difficult dyke."  It wasn't too long before she languished in her beautiful shared Montecito, California home wondering what the hell had happened.

Were Susan at the same career fulcrum today [in 1996], she'd have a fifty-fifty chance of swinging up.  In the mid-seventies, she had no chance.  Today she's back on television [in supporting roles and character parts].

Because she didn't marry to play the game, she might as well have announced that she was gay.  Other people announced it for her.  She kept silent but stiff-armed any attempts to create a bogus heterosexual life.  She and Fannie [Flagg] had been together for eight years.  The cracks in their relationship widened under the pressure.  Many of Susan and Fannie's friends knew they were lovers, but many didn't.  The isolation, under the circumstances, had to have been extremely painful for Susan.

My heart went out to her.  After my initial visit [to their Montecito home], the three of us palled around together.  The more I knew Susan, the more I liked her.

If there had been a way for the three of us to live together, I would have tried it because I grew to respect Susan and to value her for the generous and kind person she is. Like her Irish forebears, she engaged her crisis with good humor and the hope that she'd learn something.

Filmography

Awards and nominations

References

External links
 
 

1939 births
Living people
American television actresses
American soap opera actresses
Daytime Emmy Award winners
Daytime Emmy Award for Outstanding Lead Actress in a Drama Series winners
New Star of the Year (Actress) Golden Globe winners
Actresses from Jersey City, New Jersey
Actresses from Santa Barbara, California
American lesbian actresses
LGBT people from New Jersey
21st-century American women